Rugeley is a market town and a civil parish in the district of Cannock Chase, Staffordshire, England.  It contains 30 buildings that are recorded in the National Heritage List for England.  Of these, two are listed at Grade II*, the middle grade, and the others are at Grade II, the lowest grade.  The parish contains three churches, the current parish church of St Augustine, the remains of its predecessor, and a Roman Catholic church; items in the churchyards of the first two churches are also listed.  Most of the other listed buildings are houses and cottages, the earliest of which are timber framed.  The rest of the listed buildings include a two public houses, a bridge, two boundary stones, and a water pumping station.


Key

Buildings

References

Citations

Sources

Lists of listed buildings in Staffordshire
Listed